The Russian route R217, also known as the Caucasus Highway, is a trunk road that extends from Krasnodar to Chechnya and Dagestan, terminating at Russia's border with Azerbaijan. Its length is 1118 km. The route is part of European route E50 from Pavlovskaya to Makhachkala, European route E117 from Mineralnye Vody to Beslan, and European route E119 from Makhachkala to the Azeri border. The portion from Khasavyurt to the Azeri border is also part of AH8. Before 2018 the route was designated M29.

Major towns along the road include Kropotkin, Nevinnomyssk, Mineralnye Vody, Pyatigorsk, Nalchik, Beslan, Grozny, Gudermes, Khasavyurt, Makhachkala, and Derbent. After skirting the Greater Caucasus, the route continues as the M1 to Baku.

Roads in Russia
Caucasus